Malik Naseer Ahmed Shahwani is a Pakistani politician who is the member-elect of the Provincial Assembly of Balochistan.

Political career
Shahwani was elected to the Provincial Assembly of Balochistan as a candidate of Balochistan National Party (Mengal) (BNP-M) from the constituency PB-32 in 2018 Pakistani general election held on 25 July 2018. He defeated Abdul Ghafoor Haideri of Muttahida Majlis-e-Amal (MMA). Shahwani garnered 6,795 votes while his closest rival secured 4,434 votes.

References

Living people
Balochistan National Party (Mengal) politicians
Politicians from Balochistan, Pakistan
Year of birth missing (living people)